Charrm was a British record label based in Newcastle upon Tyne, UK operated by the company Charrm Limited. It was founded in 1989 and ceased trading in 2002. The label was created predominantly to act as a production and distribution operation for recordings by the British avant garde music group :zoviet*France:.

Discography 
(In chronological order)

See also 
Zoviet France

External links 
discogs.com, a community-built database of music information

Experimental music record labels
Record labels established in 1989
Defunct record labels of the United Kingdom
Culture in Newcastle upon Tyne
British companies established in 1989
British companies disestablished in 2002
Record labels disestablished in 2002
Companies based in Newcastle upon Tyne